Prameelarjuneeyam is a 1965 Telugu-language Hindu mythological film directed by M. Mallikarjuna Rao. It stars N. T. Rama Rao and B. Saroja Devi, with music composed by Pendyala Nageswara Rao. It was produced by K. Adi Babu and K. Nagumani under the S.R. Movies banner.

Plot
The film starts at the end of Dvapara Yuga, Prameela (B. Saroja Devi), a beautiful woman and dynamic warrior who hates men, establishes a kingdom for women.

After the completion of the Kurukshetra War, Dharma Raju (Mikkilineni) performs Aswamedha Yaaga by sending Arjuna (N. T. Rama Rao) as a guardian for Yaagaswa, the horse. Arjuna starts along with Karna's son Rushakethu (Sobhan Babu). On the way, he meets Ghatotkacha's son Patti (Relangi) and all of them move together.

After crossing many kingdoms, Sage Narada (Padmanabham) diverts the horse towards Prameela's kingdom. As soon as the horse enters their kingdom, the woman warriors capture the horse along with the men by a trap. Here they try to arrest Arjuna also when Lord Krishna (Kanta Rao) comes to his rescue and suggests an idea to make Prameela and all other women fall in love with men. Arjuna succeeds in it, and Prameela starts loving him when Prameela's mentor Bhagavathi (Rushyendramani) awakes the female dominance.

So, she stands up for the war with Arjuna, then Lord Krishna comes in between them and makes her realize that both men and women are equal. Finally, the film ends with the marriage ceremony of all men warriors with female warriors including Arjuna with Prameela.

Cast
N. T. Rama Rao as Arjuna
B. Saroja Devi as Prameela
Kanta Rao as Lord Krishna
Sobhan Babu as Vrushaketu
Relangi as Ghaku
Padmanabham as Narada Maharshi 
Mikkilineni as Dharmaraja
Balakrishna as Vrushaketu's friend
Vanisri as Gambiram
Chandrakala 
Rajasree as Kittamma
Girija as Maha Maaya
Rushyendramani as Bhagavathi  
Chayadevi as Ranachandi 
Suryakala 
Athili Lakshmi as Adi Parasakthi

Soundtrack

Music composed by Pendyala Nageswara Rao. Lyrics were written by Pingali Nagendra Rao. Music released by AVM Audio Company.

References

Hindu mythological films
Films scored by Pendyala Nageswara Rao
Films based on the Mahabharata